Magda Szabó (October 5, 1917 – November 19, 2007) was a Hungarian novelist. Doctor of philology, she also wrote dramas, essays, studies, memoirs, poetry and children's literature. She is the most translated Hungarian author, with publications in 42 countries and over 30 languages.

Early life 
Magda Szabó was born in Debrecen, Austria-Hungary in 1917. Her father was an academic and taught her English and Latin. 

In 1940, she graduated from the University of Debrecen as a teacher of Latin and of Hungarian. She began teaching in the same year at the Protestant Girls Boarding School in Debrecen and Hódmezővásárhely. From 1945 to 1949, she worked in the Ministry of Religion and Education.

She married the writer and translator Tibor Szobotka (1913–1982) in 1947.

Writing career 
Szabó began her writing career as a poet and in 1947 she published her first book of poetry, Bárány ("Lamb"), which was followed by Vissza az emberig ("Back to the Human") in 1949. In 1949 she was awarded the Baumgarten Prize, which was immediately withdrawn when Szabó was labeled an enemy to the Communist Party. She was dismissed from the Ministry in the same year. The Stalinist era from 1949 to 1956 censored any literature, such as Szabó's work, that did not conform to socialist realism. Since her husband was also censored by the communist regime, she was forced to teach in a Calvinist girls' school until 1959.

She wrote her first novel, Freskó ("Fresco") during these years, and it was published in 1958. The novel tells the story of a puritan family coming together for a funeral, and examines questions of hypocrisy and Hungarian history. In the same year, she published another book of poetry, Bárány Boldizsár ("Lawrence the Lamb"), and a novel for younger female readers, Mondják meg Zsófikának (translated into English as "Tell Sally ..."). 

Az őz ("The Fawn"), published in 1959, is a novel centered around an actress and her struggle to overcome a difficult, impoverished childhood. In this novel, Szabó effectively portrays the psychological, internal world of the modern woman. In 1961 and 1962, Szabó published two more novels for young women, Álarcosbál ("Masked Ball") and Születésnap ("Birthday") respectively. Pilátus ("Iza's Ballad"), the story of a female doctor and her relationship with her mother, was published in 1963. Tündér Lala ("Lara the Fairy"), her 1965 novel, is one of the most popular novels for children written in Hungarian. In 1969, she published Katalin utca ("Katalin Street"), a realistic depiction of post-World War II life. Her most widely read novel Abigél ("Abigail", 1970) is an adventure story about a young girl living in a Calvinist girls-only school in eastern Hungary during World War II. The novel's success resulted in a TV series, produced in 1978; the novel was also adapted into a musical that premiered in March 2008. In 1971, Szabó began a series of autobiographical works, which depict her family history. The first of this series is the short novel, Ókút ("The Ancient Well"), followed by Régimódi történet ("Old-Fashioned Story"). In 2002, Szabó continued this autobiographical series with Für Elise, a recollection of the author's life from 1917 to 1935. Today, this is one of her most popular works in Hungarian.

In 1975, Szabó published a collection of plays titled Az órák és a farkasok ("The Wolf Hours"). She published two more dramas in 1984, Erőnk szerint ("According to Our Strength") and Béla Király ("King Béla").

Her novel Az ajtó (The Door) was published in 1987 and would become one of her most famous works worldwide. The novel revolves around the relationship between two women, one a prominent Hungarian writer much like Szabó herself, and the other her cryptic housekeeper. Claire Messud writes in the New York Times that reading The Door, has completely changed her outlook on life while Cynthia Zarin, contributor to The New Yorker, calls it "a bone-shaking book." The Door was translated into English in 1995 by Stefan Draughon and again in 2005 by Len Rix.

Selected bibliography 

Mondják meg Zsófikának (1958). Tell Sally..., trans. Ursula McLean (Corvina Press, 1963).
Az őz (1959). The Fawn, trans. Kathleen Szasz (J. Cape, 1963; Knopf, 1963); later by Len Rix (New York Review Books, 2023).
Disznótor (1960). Night of the Pig-Killing, trans. Kathleen Szasz (J. Cape, 1965; Knopf, 1966).
Pilátus (1963). Iza's Ballad, trans. George Szirtes (Harvill Secker, 2014; New York Review Books, 2016).
Katalin utca (1969). Katalin Street, trans. Agnes Farkas Smith (Kids 4 Kids, 2005); later by Len Rix (New York Review Books, 2017).
Abigél (1970). Abigail, trans. Len Rix (New York Review Books, 2020).
Az ajtó (1987). The Door, trans. Stefan Draughon (East European Monographs, 1995); later by Len Rix (Harvill Press, 2005; New York Review Books, 2015).

Awards and prizes 
 1949: awarded the Baumgarten Prize, although it was withdrawn the same day. 
 1959, 1972: awarded the József Attila, a top Hungarian literary prize. 
 1978: awarded the Kossuth Prize.
 2003: a French translation of "The Door" by Chantal Philippe is awarded the Prix Femina étranger, a French literary award, for the best foreign novel 
 Abigél was chosen as the sixth most popular novel in the Hungarian version of Big Read. Three more of her novels appeared in the top 100: Für Elise, An Old-Fashioned Story and The Door. 
 2006: Len Rix's English translation of The Door awarded the Oxford-Weidenfeld Translation Prize. 
 2006: Len Rix's English translation of The Door shortlisted for the Independent Foreign Fiction Prize 2006. 
 2007: French translation of Katalin Street awarded the 2007 Prix Cévennes du roman européen.
 2015: Len Rix's English translation of The Door listed as one of the New York Times Book Review 10 Best Books of 2015
 2018: 2018 PEN Translation Prize for Katalin Street, translated by Len Rix
 2019: Warwick Prize for Women in Translation (short-listed) for Len Rix's translation of Katalin Street
 2020: Hyman Wingate Prize for Writing about Jewry, long-listed for Len Rix's translation of Katalin Street
 2020: Warwick Prize for Women in Translation (short-listed) for Len Rix's translation of Abigail

Tribute
On October 5, 2017, Google celebrated her 100th birthday with a Google Doodle.

References

External links
Biography, quotes and publications
Magda Szabo in the History of Hungarian Literature
Labours of love, review of "The Door" by The Guardian, October 29, 2005
Biography, including a list of her translated works
Times Literary Supplement review of Katalin Street and Abigail

1917 births
2007 deaths
Hungarian women novelists
Prix Femina Étranger winners
Members of the European Academy of Sciences and Arts
University of Debrecen alumni
Hungarian children's writers
Hungarian women children's writers
20th-century Hungarian novelists
20th-century Hungarian women writers
International Writing Program alumni
Attila József Prize recipients
20th-century Hungarian dramatists and playwrights
20th-century Hungarian poets
Hungarian women dramatists and playwrights
Hungarian women poets
Members of the Széchenyi Academy of Literature and Arts